Niedźwiadek is a residential neighbourhood, and an area of the Municipal Information System, in the city of Warsaw, Poland, located within the district of Ursus.

History 
The construction of the neighbourhood of Niedźwiadek began in 1968, on an area previously covered by farmlands. The construction lasted until 1978. It was originally a neighbourhood of the town of Ursus, which in 1977 was incorporated into the city of Warsaw. The neighbourhood was built by Robotnicza Spółdzielnia Mieszkaniowa Ursus (Ursus Worker's Housing Association), with the urban layout designed by Jerzy Gieysztor. Niedźwiadek was built to provide housing to the employees of the nearby Ursus factory.

Public transit 
In the neighbourhood is located the Warszawa Ursus-Niedźwiadek railway station.

Citations

Notes

References 

Neighbourhoods of Ursus
Populated places established in 1968
1968 establishments in Poland